Okahumpka is an unincorporated community and census-designated place (CDP) in Lake County, Florida, United States. The population was 267 at the 2010 census. It is part of the Orlando–Kissimmee Metropolitan Statistical Area.

It is the location of the Historic Campbell House, listed on the National Register of Historic Places.

Geography
Okahumpka is located in western Lake County. County Road 33 passes through the community, leading northeast  to U.S. Route 27, which leads  farther north to Leesburg; and south  to Mascotte. County Road 48 leads east  to US-27 and southwest  to Center Hill. County Road 470 leads west  to an interchange with Florida's Turnpike.

Demographics

As of the census of 2000, there were 251 people, 108 households, and 72 families residing in the CDP. The racial makeup of the CDP was 98.80% White, 0.80% African American, 0.40% from other races. Hispanic or Latino of any race were 0.80% of the population.

There were 108 households, out of which 26.9% had children under the age of 18 living with them, 45.4% were married couples living together, 14.8% had a female householder with no husband present, and 33.3% were non-families. 25.9% of all households were made up of individuals, and 7.4% had someone living alone who was 65 years of age or older.  The average household size was 2.32 and the average family size was 2.74.

In the CDP, the population was spread out, with 18.7% under the age of 18, 9.6% from 18 to 24, 29.9% from 25 to 44, 30.3% from 45 to 64, and 11.6% who were 65 years of age or older.  The median age was 40 years. For every 100 females, there were 105.7 males.  For every 100 females age 18 and over, there were 106.1 males.

The median income for a household in the CDP was $19,219, and the median income for a family was $50,268. Males had a median income of $25,313 versus $20,179 for females. The per capita income for the CDP was $12,684.  About 17.5% of families and 31.4% of the population were below the poverty line, including 74.4% of those under the age of eighteen and 29.6% of those 65 or over.

Notable People

Virgil D. Hawkins (1906-1988), Civil Rights Attorney, born in Okahumpka

References

Census-designated places in Lake County, Florida
Greater Orlando
Census-designated places in Florida